Virginia Flats, also known as the Summit Place Flats, are two historic apartment buildings located at St. Joseph, Missouri.  They were designed by the architectural firm Eckel & Mann.  The south building was built in 1901, and is a two-story, rectangular Colonial Revival style brick four-plex with a hipped roof and a full-length, one-story front porch. The north building was built in 1888, and is a larger two-story rectangular brick Queen Anne style apartment building with 14 apartments, 7 on each floor.

It was listed on the National Register of Historic Places in 1992.  It is located in the Cathedral Hill Historic District

References

Individually listed contributing properties to historic districts on the National Register in Missouri
Residential buildings on the National Register of Historic Places in Missouri
Queen Anne architecture in Missouri
Colonial Revival architecture in Missouri
Residential buildings completed in 1888
Residential buildings in St. Joseph, Missouri
National Register of Historic Places in Buchanan County, Missouri